Raniji ki Baori (or Queen's stepwell) is a noted stepwell situated in Bundi town in Rajasthan state in India. It was built in 1699 by Rani Nathavati Ji Solanki who was the younger queen of the ruling Rao Raja Anirudh Singh of Bundi. It is a 46 meter deep stepped well with some superb carvings on its pillars and a high arched gate. It is a multistorey structure with places of worship on each floor. The step well has a narrow entrance marked by four pillars. Stone elephant statues that face each other stand in the corners. Ogee brackets decorate all the archways of 46 m deep Raniji ki Baori, which is reputedly the largest Baori of Bundi. Baoris were significant social constructions in the medieval Bundi since they acted as assembly areas for the townsfolk. Raniji ki Baori has superb carvings on its pillars and a high arched gate.

It was constructed during the reign of her son Maharao Raja Budh Singh who ruled Bundi from 1695 AD to 1729 AD.

References 
The Queen's Stepwell of Bundi – Raniji ki Baori
http://tdil.mit.gov.in/e_tourism_cdac/tourism1/MIT_E_TOURISM_BUNDI.HTML

External links

Raniji ki Baori

Stepwells in Rajasthan
Buildings and structures completed in 1699
Rajasthani architecture
Bundi
Tourist attractions in Bundi district
1699 establishments in Asia